The Partridge Island, part of the Partridge Island Group, is an  island that lies close to the south-eastern coast of Tasmania, Australia. The island is situated in the D'Entrecasteaux Channel, between Bruny Island and the mainland of Tasmania and is part of the South Bruny National Park.

The other islands in the Partridge Island Group are:

 Arch Rock
 Charity Island
 Curlew Island
 Faith Island
 Garden Island
 Hope Island
 Huon Island
 Satellite Island
 Seagull Rock

Flora and fauna
The vegetation is mainly dry eucalypt forest with a grassy understorey. Little penguins breed on the island.  The endangered forty-spotted pardalote is present.  European rabbits were introduced to the island but have since been eradicated.  The eastern blue-tongued lizard has been recorded.

Acquisition
The island was privately owned and purchased from Dibbern estate on 8 January 1974 by Richard Ham, a Melbourne doctor, for $50,000. Dr Ham intended to establish an Outward Bound-style sailing school. On 16 May 1975, an inspector from the Department of Lands arrived on Partridge Island and presented Dr Ham with a letter indicating that the Tasmanian Government intended to resume the island. Today, Partridge Island is administered by the Tasmanian Parks and Wildlife Service as part of the South Bruny National Park. Since acquisition, the island's maintenance has been neglected. Blackberries and English ivy have invaded the bush and the jetty has become hazardous.

See also

 List of islands of Tasmania
 Cyprus mutiny

References

Islands of South East Tasmania
Protected areas of Tasmania
Private islands of Tasmania
South Bruny National Park